The Tiger Game is a popular Chinese board game. It is a strategy game for two players. One player, who plays the tiger, has only one piece. The other player has 18 men. The tiger must eat the men, who must block the tiger so that he cannot move. The game can be played with any kind of pieces that can be distinguished from one another. The board is 8×8 squares, with the addition of a square of 2×2 squares, which is called the tiger’s lair.

Play
The men cannot take the tiger, but can only block him. The Tiger, by jumping over a man, can take it, in which case the man is removed from play. The men must stay together 2 by 2 to block the tiger. In general, if a tiger eats more than three pieces, it is unlikely that men will have enough pieces to win the game. If the men do not make mistakes, but move cautiously, victory is likely.

See also
Tiger and buffaloes
Fox games
Leopard hunt game
Main Tapal Empat
Rimau
Aadu puli attam
Bagh-Chal
Deer Games
Tibet Tiger Games

Board games
Chinese games
Abstract strategy games